Kelidbar (also Romanized as Kelīdbar and Kelīd Bor) is a village in Daryasar Rural District, Kumeleh District, Langarud County, Gilan Province, Iran. At the 2006 census, its population was 1,993, in 553 families.

References 

Populated places in Langarud County